Lists of animal and plant species that are endangered, threatened, rare or uncommon in Rabun County, Georgia are maintained by both the United States Fish and Wildlife Service and the Georgia Department of Natural Resources.

Animals 
This lists the animal species that are endangered, threatened, rare or uncommon in Rabun County.

Plants 
This lists the animal species that are endangered, threatened, rare or uncommon in Rabun County.

References 

Rabun County
Rabun County
Rabun County, Georgia
Georgia
Rabun County